The qualification standards are set by the European Union of Gymnastics (UEG).

Qualification timeline

Qualification summary

Acrobatic

Mixed Pairs

Women's Groups

Aerobic

Mixed Pairs

1One gymnast from Pairs must compete in the Group to make up required Group numbers (6), thus lower numbers.

Groups

Artistic

Men

Women

Rhythmic

Individual

Group

Trampoline

Men's

NOC's with two gymnasts qualified will compete in synchro and individual events.

Women's

NOC's with two gymnasts qualified will compete in synchro and individual events.

References 

European Games
Qualification
Qualification for the 2015 European Games